Francesco, Principe Ruspoli (23 February 1899 – 27 October 1989) was the 8th Principe di Cerveteri, 8th Marchese di Riano, 13th Conte di Vignanello and Prince of the Holy Roman Empire, son of Alessandro Ruspoli, 7th Prince of Cerveteri and wife Marianita dei Duchi Lante Montefeltro della Rovere. His maternal grandmother was an American heiress from New York City, New York. His great-great-great-great-uncle was Bartolomeo Ruspoli and his great-great-great-great grandfather was Ippolito Lante Montefeltro della Rovere. He later became a poet and fought in both World Wars.

Marriages and children
He married firstly in São Paulo, São Paulo, on 28 February 1924, Claudia dei Conti Matarazzo (Castellabate, 12 March 1899 – Rome, 30 October 1935), daughter of Francesco, 1st Conte Matarazzo, Italian-Brazilian industrialist and tycoon, and wife Filomena Sansivieri, and grandaunt of Brazilian television and film director Jayme Monjardim, heiress to one of the largest fortunes in Brazil, by whom he had two sons:

Alessandro Ruspoli, 9th Prince of Cerveteri
Don Sforza Marescotto dei Principi Ruspoli (Rome, 23 January 1927 –), married firstly at Migliarino on 30 November 1946 and divorced in 1983 Flavia Domitilla dei Duchi Salviati (Rome, 28 April 1925 – Migliarino Pisano, 6 April 2007), and had two daughters. And married secondly at Vignanello on 15 October 1983 Pia Giancaro (Palermo, 12 March 1950, and had one daughter:
Donna Claudia dei Principi Ruspoli (São Paulo, São Paulo, 30 August 1947 –), unmarried and without issue
Donna Giada dei Principi Ruspoli (Rome, 8 March 1949 –), married Giovanni Angelo Theodoli di San Vito e Pisoniano, 6th Duke of Nemi (Bologna, 1 May 1942).
Giacinta Ortensia Rosa Maria dei Principi Ruspoli (Paris, 3 March 1988 –)

He married secondly, on 4 May 1946, Maria Celeste Rossi (3 October 1916 – Rome, 12 February 1997), without issue.

Ancestry

References

External links
Francesco Ruspoli on a genealogical site

Notes

See also
Ruspoli

1899 births
1989 deaths
Francesco
Francesco
Nobility from Rome
Military personnel from Rome